Hitesh Subhash Modi (born 13 October 1971) is a former Kenyan cricketer. He was a left-handed batsman and a right-arm offbreak bowler.

International career
Having made his ODI debut in 1992, Modi had ever been part of the middle order of the team, as well as being involved in the 1996, 1999 and 2003 Cricket World Cups and the 1994 and 1997 ICC Trophy. Having seen several players fall by the wayside due to disagreements over contracts, including Steve Tikolo, Modi was invested as captain.

Family
Modi's father is Subhash Modi, and the pair are unique as the only father/son pair to appear as batsman and umpire in the same One-day International. Against Bangladesh at Nairobi in August 2006, father gave son out lbw.

References

External links
 

1971 births
Living people
Kenya One Day International cricketers
Cricketers at the 1996 Cricket World Cup
Kenyan people of Indian descent
Cricketers at the 1998 Commonwealth Games
Cricketers at the 1999 Cricket World Cup
Cricketers at the 2003 Cricket World Cup
Kenyan Hindus
Kenyan cricketers
Gujarati people
Kenyan people of Gujarati descent
Commonwealth Games competitors for Kenya
People from Kisumu County